Raphael Ohanua Lea'i Jr. (born 9 September 2003) is a Solomon Islands footballer who plays as a striker for Premier League BH club FK Velež Mostar and the Solomon Islands national team.

Early life
Lea'i was born on 9 September 2003 in Honiara. Taking up futsal at the age of 12, he played for local side Kossa before moving to Marist.

Club career

Following promising performances at international level, Lea'i was noticed by foreign clubs, including Argentine Primera División club Deportivo Godoy Cruz and Australian A-League side Brisbane Roar. Both clubs offered him a trial, however due to FIFA regulations on youth footballers, he was unable to sign an overseas professional contract before the age of 18.

By the end of 2018, Lea'i had made his senior debut for Marist scoring four goals across six matches in the 2018 Solomon Islands S-League. For 2019, Lea'i was offered a scholarship to New Zealand high school Scots College, affiliated with A-League club Wellington Phoenix. He ended the season as the local Wellington high school league's top scorer, having scored 15 of Scots' 41 goals for the season.

Following his time in New Zealand, Lea'i signed with Henderson Eels for the end of the 2019–20 S-League season. In his first season he scored 24 goals in seven matches, including a haul of 11 goals in a single match against Real Kakamora. At the end of the 2019–20 S-League season, Lea'i was invited to a weeklong trial with A-League side Melbourne Victory. During the beginning of the 2021–22 S-League season, he was offered a trial with Turkish Süper Lig side Alanyaspor, however Visa issues caused this to be delayed.

Velež Mostar

In January 2023, it was announced that Lea'i was returning to Europe to trial with FK Velež Mostar of the Premier League of Bosnia and Herzegovina. It was originally reported that the stint in Bosnia and Herzegovina was only part of the player's preparation for another trial with Alanyaspor. However, it was later clarified that Lea'i was traveling to Turkey with Mostar as part of his trial with the club. After a successful trial match against NK Neretvanac Opuzen of Croatia's 3. NL, Lea'i signed a contract with the club until the end of the 2023–24 season. In the process, Lea'i become the first Solomon Islander to sign for a professional club in Europe.

International career
By the age of 14, Lea'i had impressed enough to be selected for the 2017 OFC Youth Futsal Tournament. Despite being three years younger than some of his opponents, Lea'i shone through as the tournament's best player and top scorer, scoring 34 goals in six matches. He was pivotal to the success of the undefeated Solomon Islands team, helping them sweep aside the competition to take the title as well as qualifying for the 2018 Youth Olympics in Argentina. At the 2018 Youth Olympics, Lea'i scored seven goals as the Solomon Islands were eliminated in the group stage. 

In September 2018, Lea'i was selected for the 2018 OFC U-16 Championship, held in Honiara. Once again, he was crucial to the success of the Solomon Islands team, scoring seven goals in three consecutive 5–0 wins over Papua New Guinea, New Zealand and Vanuatu. Solomon Islands subsequently qualified for the 2019 FIFA U-17 World Cup by defeating Fiji 3–1 in the semi-final. In the final, he missed a penalty just before full-time, with New Zealand eventually prevailing 5–4 in a penalty shootout.

Lea'i was selected to take part in the 2019 U-17 Minsk Tournament in preparation for the 2019 FIFA U-17 World Cup. He scored in all three games; one in a 2–1 win over Moldova, as well as a goal in a 1–1 draw against Belarus and both goals in a 2–2 draw against Kazakhstan.

In the 2019 FIFA U-17 World Cup, Lea'i appeared in all three games - against Italy, Paraguay and Mexico - as the Solomon Islands were eliminated in the group stage.

During 2022 FIFA World Cup qualification, Raphael Lea'i scored all three goals in a 3–1 win against Tahiti to cement Solomon Islands' spot top of Group A and qualify to the semi-finals as group winners.

International goals
Scores and results list the Solomon Islands' goal tally first.

International statistics

Career statistics

Club

References

External links
National Football Teams profile
 

2003 births
Living people
Futsal forwards
Solomon Islands footballers
People from Honiara
Marist F.C. players
Association football forwards
Solomon Islands international footballers
Solomon Islands men's futsal players
FK Velež Mostar players
Premier League of Bosnia and Herzegovina players